Florence "Jean" May Winder (1909-2006) was the first woman to hold a permanent post as a parliamentary reporter for Hansard, the official record of debate in the Houses of Parliament in the UK.  Appointed in 1944, she pushed for equal pay for women reporters and achieved this in 1953. She then became the first woman to make a speech at a Press Gallery dinner. She retired in 1960.

Early life 
Florence May Hayward, known as "Jean", was born in Stockwell, London on 23 April 1907. Her parents managed pubs around south London until her father's death in 1913. Hayward trained as a secretary at Hettie Craig-Kelly's secretarial college in Moorgate, London. Craig-Kelly picked Hayward to accompany her on the Royal Commission to the West Indies with the Moyne Commission in 1938–9.

Hayward married Lieutenant Ralph Spearing Winder on 4 October 1940 in London but was widowed when he died on active service in 1941.

Parliamentary career 
On 18 January 1944, Florence Winder was appointed as a temporary reporter for the House of Commons' Hansard. The editor, Percy Cole, made it clear he had only appointed a woman as there were no men available. The following year, in November 1945, she was made permanent, with Cole admitting she was a "capable and efficient" reporter. By 1947, he was citing her as an example of good work when giving evidence to a Select Committee. Winston Churchill described her as "a shorthand writer's dream".

Her initial salary, in 1944, was £400. After becoming permanent, she was placed on a salary scale of £450-600. The equivalent men's salary was £560-700. From 1951, when she had reached the top of her scale, she campaigned to receive equal pay to the men. She was supported in her campaign by Douglas Clifton-Brown and Irene Ward. The latter raised Winder's case in the House of Commons in a debate on Equal Pay in 1951 as well as writing many letters demanding equal pay. The Treasury, who set the pay scales, finally equalised Winder's pay with the men in 1951. She resigned in 1960, just before remarrying, and there were no further women reporters for Hansard until 1968.

Later life 
On 14 May 1960, Winder married Jack Hawke, the parliamentary correspondent for the Daily Telegraph and chairman of the Parliamentary Press Gallery. On Hawke's retirement, the couple moved to Devon. Hawke died in 1998, and Winder died of old age on 26 December 2005 in Dawlish.

References 

British_women_journalists
1909 births
2006 deaths
People from Stockwell
Journalists from London